Saint Maurice was a federal electoral district in Quebec, Canada, that was represented in the House of Commons of Canada from 1867 to 1896. Saint-Maurice was a federal electoral district in Quebec, Canada, that was represented in the House of Commons of Canada from 1968 to 2004.

The electoral district of Saint Maurice was formed in 1867, the continuation of the pre-confederation electoral division with the same delimitation. In 1892, it was merged with the district of Trois-Rivières to form Three Rivers and St. Maurice.

A Saint-Maurice district was re-established in 1966 out of the former districts of Champlain and Saint-Maurice—Laflèche. The district was abolished in 2003 when it was redistributed into Berthier—Maskinongé and Saint-Maurice—Champlain ridings.

A high-profile MP was the former Prime Minister of Canada, Jean Chrétien, who represented the riding of Saint-Maurice—Laflèche for five years and the riding of Saint-Maurice for 29 years.

Members of Parliament

This ridings elected the following Members of Parliament:

Election results

Saint Maurice, 1867–1886

Saint-Maurice, 1968–2004

Notes and references

See also
 History of Canada
 History of Quebec
 List of Canadian federal electoral districts
 Mauricie
 Past Canadian electoral districts
 Politics of Canada
 Politics of Quebec
 Saint-Maurice—Champlain Federal Electoral District
 Saint-Maurice Provincial Electoral District
 Shawinigan

External links 
 Riding history of Saint Maurice (1867-1896) from the Library of Parliament
 Riding history of Saint-Maurice (1968-2004) from the Library of Parliament

Former federal electoral districts of Quebec